Attorney General Roberts may refer to:

Charles Boyle Roberts (1842–1899), Attorney General of Maryland
Denys Roberts (1923–2013), Attorney General of Hong Kong
Kelso Roberts (1898–1970), Attorney General of Ontario